TV Paprika  is a Hungarian television channel operated by AMC Networks International Central Europe. Its name is a pun on how peppers for making stuffed peppers is often labelled at markets, short for "tölteni való paprika" which means "peppers to fill".

External links
www.tvpaprika.hu

AMC Networks International
Television networks in Hungary
Television channels and stations established in 2004
2004 establishments in Hungary